Nanshan Temple is a Buddhist temple located in Sanya, Hainan province, China. The temple's name originates from a popular Buddhist expression..

History 
The temple was built on April 12, 1988, to commemorate two thousand years of Buddhism in China. It has a total area of 40,000 square metres. It contains several Tang dynasty replicas.

The temple is part of an area known as the Nanshan Buddhism Cultural Zone, classified as a AAAAA scenic area by the China National Tourism Administration.

Geography 
It is located just 40 kilometers west of Sanya City along the Hainan West Expressway. It is a window on China's traditional Buddhism culture.

Summary 

The Nanshan Cultural Tourism Zone is a large Buddhist complex located 40 km west of Sanya. The area highlights consists of gardens, sculptures, sea views, and different sites dedicated to Buddhist worship. One of its attractions is the 3-sided Guanyin (Goddess of Mercy) statue and at 354 feet (108m) high, is the tallest Guanyin statue in the world. There is also another buddhist statue nearby in Nanshan temple, the Golden Jade Kwan-yin Statue (Avalokiteshvara, Goddess of Compassion). The Statue is considered to be a national treasure with the height of 3.8 meters (12.5 feet) and with a cost of 192 million yuan. It was constructed out of gold, diamonds and jade, among other precious stones. 

The zone has been designated a Priority Project of China Tourism Development and earmarked for further development. Hainan is the only province in China to explicitly be identified by the Chinese authorities for the development of tourism as a mainstay industry. It is also intended to become a test zone for China's tourism reform and tech innovation.

References

External links 

http://www.nanshantemple.com[ Nanshan temple official website ] 
Nanshan Cultural Tourism Commission 

Buddhist temples in China
Buildings and structures in Hainan
Tourist attractions in Sanya
Sanya
Religion in Hainan